This article contains a complete list of list of Michelin starred restaurants in Florida. The guide announced its first list of restaurants in the state of Florida on 9 June 2022, after striking a deal the year prior with tourism boards in the state. The guide gave out a single 2 star ranking and fourteen 1 star rankings, as well as 29 Bib Gourmands.

2022

References

Lists of restaurants
Restaurants in Florida
Florida
Florida-related lists